This is a list of all cricketers who have played first-class or List A cricket for Central Zone cricket team.

Last updated at the end of the 2015/16 season.

A–F

 Mohammad Abdul Hai
 Madhusudan Acharya
 Haseen Ahmed
 Imtiyaz Ahmed
 Aslam Ali
 Hyder Ali
 Imran Ali
 Mushtaq Ali
 Raja Ali
 Syed Abbas Ali
 Syed Gulrez Ali
 Syed Mushtaq Ali
 Pravin Amre
 Ibrahim Ansari
 Suhail Ansari
 Anureet Singh
 Chandrashekhar Atram
 Narendra Bagatheria
 Anand Bais
 Ashok Bambi
 Pradeep Banerjee
 Sanjay Bangar
 Sunil Benjamin
 Suthar Bhagwandas
 Maharana of Mewar
 Ashok Bhagwat
 Anil Bhanot
 P. Bhave
 Udit Birla
 Rajesh Bishnoi
 Robin Bist
 Devendra Bundela
 Alfred Burrows
 Sunil Chaturvedi
 Rajesh Chauhan
 Vedraj Chauhan
 Piyush Chawla
 Karim Chisty
 Aakash Chopra
 Nikhil Chopra
 Vijay Chopra
 Naresh Churi
 Mukul Dagar
 Madhav Dalvi
 Anup Dave
 Amit Deshpande
 Anil Deshpande
 Dinkar Deshpande
 Nikhil Doru
 Manish Dosi
 Narendra Dua
 Salim Durani
 Vikram Dutt
 Prashant Dwevedi
 Faiz Fazal

G–L

 Hiralal Gaekwad
 Pritam Gandhe
 Ulhas Gandhe
 Kailash Gattani
 Amrish Gautam
 Vikas Gawate
 Shailender Gehlot
 Yogesh Ghare
 Arindam Ghosh
 Yere Goud
 Samir Gujar
 Arjit Gupta
 Praveen Gupta
 Subhash Gupte
 Rajinder Hans
 Hanumant Singh
 Harpreet Singh
 Harvinder Singh
 Manzur Hasan
 Laxmi Hazaria
 Praveen Hingnikar
 Narendra Hirwani
 Nazmul Hussain
 Zakir Hussain
 Ashok Jagdale
 Sanjay Jagdale
 Deepak Jain
 Ravi Jangid
 Jaswinder Singh
 Jaswinder Singh
 Rohit Jhalani
 Subhash Jhanji
 Chandrasekhar Joshi
 Harshad Joshi
 Siddarth Joshi
 Kamal Juneja
 Mohammad Kaif
 Kishan Kala
 Obaid Kamal
 Hrishikesh Kanitkar
 Rajesh Kannojiya
 Rahul Kanwat
 Prakash Karkera
 Murali Kartik
 Kamraj Kesari
 Narsingrao Kesari
 Mehboodullah Khan
 Rafiullah Khan
 Sardar Khan
 Yusuf Ali Khan
 Shashikant Khandkar
 Balbir Khanna
 Shreyas Khanolkar
 Samir Khare
 Balkrishna Kher
 Gagan Khoda
 Prakash Khot
 Amay Khurasiya
 Syed Kirmani
 P. K. Krishnakumar
 Bhuvneshwar Kumar
 Praveen Kumar
 Mani Suresh Kumar
 Sunil Lahore
 Laxman Singh

M–R

 Ghauri Majid
 Manish Majithia
 M. N. Manian
 Vijay Manjrekar
 Vinoo Mankad
 Jacob Martin
 Anil Mathur
 Jaideep Mathur
 Kuldeep Mathur
 Sumit Mathur
 Vinod Mathur
 Ashok Menaria
 Narendra Menon
 Dharmendra Mishra
 Mohnish Mishra
 Rajneesh Mishra
 Mohammad Aslam
 Mohammad Siddique
 Manoj Mudgal
 Sanju Mudkavi
 Ali Murtaza
 K. V. R. Murthy
 Alind Naidu
 Arjun Naidu
 Gopi Naidu
 R. Narasimhan
 Narinder Singh
 Akshdeep Nath
 C. K. Nayudu
 Prakash Nayudu
 Vijay Nayudu
 Devashish Nilosey
 B. B. Nimbalkar
 Arun Ogiral
 Naman Ojha
 Amit Pagnis
 Gyanendra Pandey
 Ishwar Pandey
 Sanjay Pandey
 Chandrakant Pandit
 Pankaj Singh
 Kulamani Parida
 Parvinder Singh
 Anand Patel
 Kirti Patel
 Urvesh Patel
 Sandeep Patil
 Avash Paul
 Amit Paunikar
 Vinod Pendarkar
 Suhas Phadkar
 Vijay Pimprikar
 Prakash Poddar
 Durga Prasad
 Udamalpet Radhakrishnan
 Syed Rahim
 Suresh Raina
 Anand Rajan
 Murthy Rajan
 Raj Singh
 Khandu Rangnekar
 Sanjeeva Rao
 Ratan Singh
 Rajiv Rathore
 Mahesh Rawat
 Harshad Rawle
 Rituraj Singh
 Kishan Rungta

S–Z

 Himalaya Sagar
 Sudhir Sahu
 Mohammad Saif
 Dhiran Salvi
 Sandeep Singh
 Sanjib Sanyal
 Rahul Sapru
 Chandra Sarwate
 Madhu Sathe
 Prabhakar Sathe
 Jalaj Saxena
 Jatin Saxena
 Subodh Saxena
 Vineet Saxena
 T. A. Sekhar
 Mohammad Shahid
 Rizwan Shamshad
 Abhay Sharma
 Ankit Sharma
 Gopal Sharma
 Jitesh Sharma
 Karn Sharma
 Kishore Sharma
 Manohar Sharma
 Parthasarathy Sharma
 Rohit Sharma
 Sanjeev Sharma
 Padam Shastri
 Suresh Shastri
 Prasad Shetty
 Shalabh Shrivastava
 Anand Shukla
 Ravikant Shukla
 Saurabh Shukla
 Shivakant Shukla
 R. P. Singh
 R. P. Singh
 Tejinder Pal Singh
 Vivek Bhan Singh
 Harvinder Sodhi
 Sampathkumar Srinivasan
 Amkit Srivastava
 Rohit Srivastava
 Shalabh Srivastava
 Tanmay Srivastava
 TP Sudhindra
 Gundibail Sunderam
 Pradeep Sunderam
 Rusi Surti
 Suryaveer Singh
 Paresh Sutane
 Rakesh Tandon
 Bhalchandra Telang
 Vijay Telang
 Iqbal Thakur
 Krishna Tiwari
 Brijesh Tomar
 Sudeep Tyagi
 Prashant Vaidya
 Rajeswar Vats
 Vipin Vats
 Amitabh Vijayvargiya
 Shrikant Wagh
 Akshay Wakhare
 Ashish Yadav
 Jai Prakash Yadav
 Jyoti Yadav
 Kuldeep Yadav
 Madan Yadav
 Umesh Yadav
 Vijendra Yadav
 Vishal Yadav
 Dishant Yagnik
 Ashish Zaidi

References

Central Zone cricketers